Patrick Lussier (born 1964) is a Canadian-American filmmaker and editor, known for his numerous collaborations with director Wes Craven and fellow screenwriters Laeta Kalogridis and Todd Farmer, as well as his work in the horror genre.

Career
In 1994, Lussier was nominated at the Annual Gemini Awards for Best Picture Editing in a Dramatic Program or Series for Adrift and in 1995 he was nominated for Best Picture Editing in a Dramatic Program or Series for Heads.

In 1996, he edited the Doctor Who television film and was praised by producer Philip David Segal for the quality of his work in the limited time he had been allotted.

Lussier has worked as a film editor on most of director Wes Craven's latter films, including Wes Craven's New Nightmare, Vampire in Brooklyn, Red Eye, and all four entries in the Scream tetralogy. He made his directorial debut with The Prophecy 3: The Ascent, and co-wrote and directed the Craven-produced Dracula 2000. He also directed White Noise: The Light, which was a financial failure in spite of positive critical reception. He returned to editing on the English-language remake of The Eye starring Jessica Alba, on which he was also a visual consultant, and has also been credited as a visual consultant on Whisper and Darkness Falls amongst others.

Lussier directed the 2009 remake of My Bloody Valentine for Lionsgate Films, written by Zane Smith and Todd Farmer. On September 19, 2009, Lussier signed on to write and direct Halloween III, the second sequel to Rob Zombie's 2007 reboot of the Halloween franchise, originally scheduled for 2011 but later delayed before ultimately being cancelled. In 2010, Lussier directed the supernatural road action film Drive Angry, released on February 25, 2011. He co-wrote the screenplay with his previous collaborator Todd Farmer, of My Bloody Valentine 3D. Lussier and screenwriter Laeta Kalogridis are founding members and creative consultants for Skydance Media. The duo wrote and co-produced the fifth film in the long-running Terminator series, Terminator Genisys, released in 2015, and served as consultants for Mission: Impossible – Rogue Nation.

In 2016, Lussier returned to the Scream franchise to direct the second season finale for the MTV television series adaptation "When a Stranger Calls". Recently, Lussier directed and co-produced the Hulu/Blumhouse anthology film "Flesh & Blood" for their new Into the Dark series. In 2019, he directed an episode of the US series The Purge for season 2.

Filmography

References

External links

Patrick Lussier on Myspace

1964 births
Living people
Canadian film directors
Canadian film editors
Horror film directors